Ivan Snihurskyi (18 May 1784 – 24 August 1847) was a Ukrainian Greek Catholic hierarch in a present-day Ukraine and Poland. He was the Eparchial Bishop of the Ukrainian Catholic Eparchy of Przemyśl, Sambir and Sanok from 1818 to 1847.

Born in Berestyany, Habsburg monarchy (present day – Lviv Oblast, Ukraine) in the family of Ukrainian Greek-Catholic priest in 1784. He was ordained a priest on 15 March 1807 by Bishop Antin Angelovych. He worked as a parish priest in the Ruthenian St. Barbara's church in Vienna from 1813 to 1818.

He was confirmed by the Holy See as an Eparchial Bishop of the Ukrainian Catholic Eparchy of Przemyśl, Sambir and Sanok on 30 March 1818. He was consecrated to the Episcopate on 30 August 1818. The principal consecrator was Metropolitan Mykhajlo Levitsky.

He died in Przemyśl on 24 August 1847.

References 

1784 births
1847 deaths
People from Lviv Oblast
People from the Kingdom of Galicia and Lodomeria
19th-century Eastern Catholic bishops
Bishops of the Ukrainian Greek Catholic Church
Bishops in Austria–Hungary
Bishops of Przemyśl